Statistics of J.League Division 2 in the 2000 season.

Overview
It was contested by 11 teams, and Consadole Sapporo won the championship.

Final table

References

J2 League seasons
2
Japan
Japan